The Government of the first Bourbon restoration replaced the French provisional government of 1814 that had been formed after the fall of Napoleon.
It was announced on 13 May 1814 by King Louis XVIII of France.
After the return of Napoleon from exile, the court fled to Ghent and the government was replaced by the French Government of the Hundred Days on 20 March 1815.

Formation

King Louis XVIII made a triumphal return to Paris on 3 May 1814, accompanied by members of the provisional council of state, commissaires of the ministerial departments, marshals of France and Generals. He was greeted by a huge crowd.
He named the new ministry on 13 May 1814.

Ministers

The ministers were:

Events
On 4 June 1814 the Charter of 1814 was proclaimed, defining the basic constitutional laws of the state.
The government soon became unpopular. Some were opposed to the reactionary policies of the government, and some were opposed to the Bourbon dynasty. The clergy openly preached intolerance and persecution of supporters of the former regime, while the army resented the rejection of their achievements under the Empire. Napoleon sensed the change of mood, left Elba and on 1 March 1815 landed on the mainland near Cannes.
He traveled north, with supporters flocking to his cause.
On 16 March 1815 Louis XVIII addressed a meeting of both chambers, appealing to them to defend the constitutional charter.
On the night of 19-20 March the king left his palace for Ghent in Belgium. Napoleon entered Paris on 20 March 1815.

References
Citations

Sources

 

French governments
1814 establishments in France
1815 disestablishments in France
Cabinets established in 1814
Cabinets disestablished in 1815